The Asia/Oceania Zone was one of three zones of regional competition in the 2006 Fed Cup.

Group I
Venue: Olympic Park, Seoul, South Korea (outdoor hard) 
Date: 20–22 April

The seven teams were divided into one pool of four teams and one pool of three teams. The teams that finished first in the pools played-off to determine which team would partake in the World Group II Play-offs. The four nations coming last or second-to-last in the pools also played-off to determine which would be relegated to Group II for 2007.

Pools

Play-offs

  advanced to 2006 World Group II Play-offs.

Group II
Venue: Olympic Park, Seoul, South Korea (outdoor hard) 
Date: 20–21 April

The four teams played in one pool of four, with the two teams placing first and second in the pool advancing to Group I for 2006.

Pool

  and  advanced to Group I for 2007.

See also
Fed Cup structure

References

 Fed Cup Profile, Australia
 Fed Cup Profile, Uzbekistan
 Fed Cup Profile, Kazakhstan
 Fed Cup Profile, India
 Fed Cup Profile, Chinese Taipei
 Fed Cup Profile, Philippines
 Fed Cup Profile, Hong Kong
 Fed Cup Profile, Syria

External links
 Fed Cup website

 
Asia Oceania
Sport in Seoul
Tennis tournaments in South Korea